Grant Whitmore (1956 –) is a former Canadian politician, who sat in the Legislative Assembly of Saskatchewan from 1991 to 1999. A member of the Saskatchewan New Democratic Party caucus, he represented the electoral districts of Biggar from 1991 to 1995, and Saskatoon Northwest from 1995 to 1999.

Prior to his election to the legislature, he was a farmer and a delegate to the Saskatchewan Wheat Pool.

References

Living people
Saskatchewan New Democratic Party MLAs
Farmers from Saskatchewan
20th-century Canadian politicians
Politicians from Saskatoon
1956 births